Anthony William Allin (born 20 April 1954) is a former English first-class and List A cricketer who played for Glamorgan and Devon. 

Allin played all his first-class matches for Glamorgan in 1976. He played List A cricket for Glamorgan, Devon and the Minor Counties. His best innings figures were 8 for 63 in Glamorgan's victory over Sussex. Two weeks later he took his best match figures, 6 for 133 and 5 for 59 against Middlesex, but this time Glamorgan lost.

After one outstanding season for Glamorgan in 1976 he decided professional cricket was not for him, and returned to the family dairy farm in Devon. He continued to play for Devon, playing 43 matches for them in the Minor Counties Cricket Championship. He is the father of the Warwickshire cricketer Tom Allin.

After many years as a dairy farmer, Allin successfully converted his farm near Bideford to worm-farming.

References

External links
 Cricket Archive Profile
 Tony Allin at the Museum of Welsh Cricket

1954 births
Living people
English cricketers
Devon cricketers
Glamorgan cricketers
Minor Counties cricketers
Sportspeople from Barnstaple